Devils Garden Volcanic Field is a volcanic field located south east of Newberry Caldera in Oregon. The  lava field consists of several flows of  pahoehoe lava that erupted from fissure vents in the northeast part of the Devils Garden. The main vent on the north end of the fissure created a lava tube system. Several small vents to the south produced the Blowouts (two large spatter cones), several small spatter cones, and flows.  Several older hills and higher areas were completely surrounded by the flows to form kipukas. The distal ends of the flows show excellent examples of inflated lava.

Devils Garden is most likely between 50,000 and 10,000 years old.  It is certainly older than the formation of Crater Lake as ash from the eruption of Mount Mazama overlays the Devils Garden lava flows.

References 
 (archived)

Landforms of Lake County, Oregon
Volcanic fields of Oregon
Deschutes National Forest
Lava fields